The Men's Netsuite Open 2016 is the men's edition of the 2016 Netsuite Open, which is a tournament of the PSA World Tour event International (prize money: $100,000). The event took place at the Justin Herman Plaza in San Francisco in the United States from 27 of September to 1 October. Grégory Gaultier won his third Netsuite Open trophy, beating James Willstrop in the final.

Prize money and ranking points
For 2016, the prize purse was $100,000. The prize money and points breakdown is as follows:

Seeds

Draw and results

See also
2016 PSA World Tour
Netsuite Open
Women's Netsuite Open 2016

References

External links
PSA Netsuite Open 2016 website
Netsuite Open official website

Netsuite Open
Netsuite Open Squash
2016 in American sports
2016 in squash